Events in the year 1992 in Spain.

Incumbents 
 Monarch – Juan Carlos I
 Prime Minister of Spain – Felipe González Márquez

Events 
20 April – Seville, Spain's 6-month Universal Exhibition, called Seville Expo '92, opens.
20 May - FC Barcelona win the European Cup final at Wembley Stadium, London, England. It is the first time the club has won the trophy; they achieved it with a 1–0 win in extra time over Italian champions Sampdoria, with Ronald Koeman scoring the only goal of the game.
25 July - 9 August 1992 Summer Olympics in Barcelona.
Madrid was declared Cultural Capital of Europe
Celebration of Columbus' first voyage to the Americas with replicas of the three ships

Popular culture

Music
 Spain finished 14th in the Eurovision Song Contest with 37 points.

Film
See List of Spanish films of 1992

Television 
Television series, La granja ends.

Literature 
 Corazón tan blanco (A Heart So White) by Javier Marías

Sport 
 The 1992 World Karate Championships are held in Granada.

Notable births 
1 January - Iván Balliu, footballer
3 January – Jon Aurtenetxe, footballer
8 January – Koke, footballer 
11 January – Daniel Carvajal, footballer 
12 January – Sergio Juste Marín, footballer
23 January – Sergio Álvarez Díaz, footballer
5 February – Cristóbal Gil Martín, footballer
12 February - Edgar Badia, footballer
13 February – Kevin Lacruz, footballer 
10 March – Pablo Espinosa, actor, singer, and musician
16 March – Albert Dalmau, footballer
20 March – Lara Arruabarrena-Vecino, tennis player
21 March – Jordi Amat, footballer
27 March – Julián Luque Conde, footballer 
28 March – Sergi Gómez, footballer
21 April – Isco, footballer 
11 May – Pablo Sarabia, footballer
17 June – Adrián Cañas, footballer 
29 June – Aitor Casas Luceño, footballer
3 July - Nathalia Ramos, actress and singer
5 July - Alberto Moreno, footballer
7 July – Víctor Arteaga, basketball player
18 August - Néstor Albiach, football player 
25 August – Borja González, footballer
19 September – Javier Espinosa, footballer
15 October – Alejandro Fernández Iglesias, footballer
3 November – Sara Hurtado, ice dancer
18 November - Asier Barahona, footballer
14 December - Marina Agoues, footballer
17 December - Abdón Prats, footballer

Notable deaths 
18 March – Antonio Molina, singer (born 1928)
2 April - Juanito, footballer (born 1954; road accident)
26 April - Luis Rosales, poet and essayist (born 1910)
2 July - Camarón de la Isla, flamenco singer (born 1950)
21 August - Isidro Lángara, football player and manager (born 1912)
25 September - César Manrique, artist, sculptor, architect and activist (born 1919).
4 November - José Luis Sáenz de Heredia, film director (born 1911)

References

 
Spain
Years of the 20th century in Spain
Spain